Mirjam Blaak (born 1950) is the Netherlands-born Ugandan Ambassador to Belgium, the Netherlands, Luxembourg and the EU. She is a member of the National Resistance Movement, the party led by Yoweri Museveni that has been in power since 1986. She married NRM fighter Ronald Batta (1950-2004), and they had two sons. Before Museveni came to power, she helped the rebel leader to get asylum in Sweden. She has defended Ugandan human rights violations and the presence of safe houses in Uganda.

Blaak earned a Master of Laws Degree at Utrecht University before working as a Protection Officer with UNHCR in Nairobi. When she became Deputy Ambassador to Brussels in 2003, she voluntarily relinquished her Dutch citizenship to become a Ugandan citizen.

Controversy 
Mirjam Blaak has downplayed human rights violation in Uganda: "I know there are safe houses, but I don't know if people are tortured there. I think safe houses exist everywhere, not just in Uganda. I think it's sometimes necessary. Not to torture people, but to keep people."

At the International Court of Justice, where she represented Uganda, she allegedly tried to prevent evidence of Ugandan human rights violations being submitted. The Ugandan house and office of the whistleblower were raided shortly after.

References

External links
CV

1950 births
Living people
Ambassadors of Uganda to the European Union
Ambassadors of Uganda to Belgium
Ambassadors of Uganda to the Netherlands
Ambassadors of Uganda to Luxembourg
Ugandan women ambassadors
Utrecht University alumni